Mont lin maya (also spelt mont lin mayar) is a traditional Burmese street snack or mont. The Burmese name literally means "husband and wife snack", and is also known as mont ok galay (မုန့်အုပ်ကလေး) or mont maung hnan (မုန့်မောင်နှံ) in Mawlamyine and Upper Myanmar.

The dish consists of crisp, round savory pancakes made with a batter consisting of rice flour, quail eggs, chickpeas, and spring onions, fried in a special metal pan.

Similar dishes
Similar desserts in the region include Vietnamese bánh khọt, Indonesian serabi, Thai khanom krok, Indian paddu, and Japanese takoyaki.

References

Burmese cuisine
Burmese desserts and snacks
Rice cakes